Pseudomerulius is a genus of fungi in the Tapinellaceae family. The genus is widespread and contains three species. P. aureus is noted as being inedible.

References

External links

Boletales
Boletales genera